Dean Vickerman (born 5 July 1971) is an Australian professional basketball coach and former player who is the head coach of Melbourne United of the National Basketball League (NBL). He was born and spent his early life in Warragul, Victoria.

Playing career
Vickerman played for the Melbourne Tigers of the NBL from 1990 to 1992. He averaged 1.1 points, 0.1 rebounds and 0.2 assists in 16 games.

Coaching career
Between 1997 and 2001, Vickerman served as an assistant coach for the North Melbourne Giants, head coach of the Rockhampton Rockets, and assistant coach of the Sydney Panthers. In 2002, he became head coach of the Wellington Saints, coaching them for just over one season before walking out on the club just four games in the 2003 season because of the club's financial uncertainty.

In 2004, Vickerman guided Melbourne University to a Big V title. He subsequently joined the Melbourne Tigers as an assistant coach for the 2004–05 and 2005–06 NBL seasons. For the 2006–07 NBL season, he served as an assistant coach for the Singapore Slingers. During this time, he also served as the head coach of the Singapore national team. Then between 2007 and 2013, he served as an assistant coach for the New Zealand Breakers.

Between 2009 and 2011, Vickerman was also the head of the Waikato Pistons, a position he earned Coach of the Year honours with in 2009 and 2011. In 2013, he became head coach of the New Zealand Breakers. In 2014–15, he guided the Breakers to their fourth NBL championship in five years. Following the 2015–16 season, he departed the Breakers.

On 6 April 2016, Vickerman was named an assistant coach of the Sydney Kings, appointed alongside Lanard Copeland to serve under newly-appointed head coach Andrew Gaze.

On 17 March 2017, Vickerman was appointed head coach of Melbourne United for two seasons. In March 2018, he guided Melbourne to the NBL championship. On 7 October 2018, his contract was extended with United for an additional three years, keeping him in Melbourne until the end of the 2021–22 season. In June 2021, he guided Melbourne to the NBL championship. On 8 November 2021, his contract was extended for a further two seasons.

National team career
In February 2023, Vickerman was appointed head coach of the Australian Boomers for the FIBA World Cup qualifiers.

References

External links
Dean Vickerman at australiabasket.com

Living people
Australian men's basketball coaches
Australian men's basketball players
Guards (basketball)
Melbourne Tigers players
Melbourne United coaches
New Zealand Breakers coaches
North Melbourne Giants coaches
Rockhampton Rockets coaches
1971 births